Lindsay Peat is an Ireland women's rugby union international. Peat represented Ireland at the 2017 Women's Rugby World Cup. Peat is an all-round sportswoman. Between 2009 and 2014 she played in three All-Ireland finals. She was a member of the Dublin team that won the All-Ireland title in 2010 and she scored two goals in the 2014 final.

Early years and education
Peat was raised in Artane, Dublin and attended Mercy College, Beaumont.
Between 2011 and 2015 Peat attended Dublin City University where she gained a BSc in Physical Education and Biology.

Association football
In 1998 Peat represented the Republic of Ireland women's national football team in qualifiers for the 1999 UEFA Women's Under-18 Championship, playing against England, the Netherlands and the Faroe Islands. Her team mates included future senior Republic of Ireland internationals Yvonne Tracy, Caroline Thorpe and Michelle Walsh as well as Elaine Harte, the future Cork senior ladies' football team goalkeeper.

Basketball

DCU Mercy
Peat began playing basketball at 13. Peat's mother, Marian, encouraged her to join a local basketball team in order to keep her occupied during the school summer holidays. Between 2005 and 2015 Peat played as a point guard for DCU Mercy, helping them win the 2007 and 2011 Basketball Ireland Women's Superleague titles.  She also captained DCU Mercy to two National Cup wins in 2010 and 2011  and represented the team at intervarsity level. In addition to playing for DCU Mercy, Peat has also served the club in various other capacities including club captain, coach, administrator and chairperson.

Ireland international
Peat has represented the Ireland women's national basketball team at various age groups from U-16 to senior level. She made her debut for the senior team in 2006 and was co-captain during the 2009–10 season. She has also represented Ireland in EuroBasket Women qualifiers.

Ladies' Gaelic football

Club level
Peat played Ladies' Gaelic football at club level for both DCU GAA and Parnells GAA. She was a member the DCU GAA team that won three O'Connor Cup between 2009 and 2011. Peat scored 0–4 as she helped Parnells win the 2015 Dublin Ladies Intermediate Championship.

Inter-county
Peat represented  at senior inter-county level and played in three All-Ireland finals, scoring 2–2. In 2010 she scored 0–1 as Dublin defeated  by 3–16 to 0–9. In 2014 she scored 2–0 as Dublin lost 2–13 to 2–12 to Cork.

Rugby union

Club and province
Peat was encouraged to play women's rugby union by Graham Byrne, the Dundalk F.C. trainer. He had also worked with Peat as a basketball strength and conditioning coach. Byrne's cousin, Shirley Corcoran, was the director of rugby union at Railway Union and in 2015 Peat eventually accepted a long standing invitation to try out for the Sandymount club. Peat has also represented Leinster in the IRFU Women's Interprovincial Series.

Ireland international
Within months of taking up women's rugby union, Peat was fast-tracked into the Ireland team by Tom Tierney. On 14 November 2015 she made her international debut when she came on as a replacement in an 8–3 defeat against England in an Autumn International at Twickenham Stoop. This was only Peat's eighth ever rugby union match.

She represented Ireland at the 2017 Women's Rugby World Cup and was voted Ireland Women's Player of the Year.

Peat has played for Ireland in the 2016, 2017, 2018, 2019, 2020 and 2021 Women's Six Nations.

Personal life
Peat has works a clerical officer for the Health Service Executive. She is married and has one son, Barra,

She is a vocal advocate for gay rights and was an ambassador for the 2019 Union Cup when she revealed that she only came out to her family and friends when she was 30.

In 2020, the Irish Examiner newspaper named her ninth in the Top 10 Most Influential Women in Irish sport.

Honours

Gaelic football

 All-Ireland Senior Ladies' Football Championship 
Winners: 2010
Runners Up: 2009, 2014
 DCU GAA
O'Connor Cup 
Winners: 2009, 2010, 2011
Runners Up: 2015
Parnells GAA
Dublin Ladies Intermediate Championship
Winners: 2015

Basketball
 DCU Mercy
Basketball Ireland Women's Superleague
Winners: 2007, 2011
National Cup
Winners: 2010, 2011 
National Varsity Title
Winners: 2007, 2008, 2012, 2014

Rugby union
 Individual
Ireland Women's Player of the Year 
Winner: 2017

References

1980 births
Living people
Alumni of Dublin City University
Association footballers from Dublin (city)
DCU ladies' Gaelic footballers
Dublin inter-county ladies' footballers
Health Service Executive people
Ireland women's international rugby union players
Irish female rugby union players
Irish schoolteachers
Irish women's basketball players
Ireland women's national basketball team players
Ladies' Gaelic footballers who switched code
Leinster Rugby women's players
Lesbian sportswomen
LGBT association football players
LGBT basketball players
LGBT Gaelic footballers
LGBT rugby union players
Irish LGBT sportspeople
Parnells Gaelic footballers (Dublin)
Point guards
Railway Union rugby union players
Republic of Ireland women's association footballers
Republic of Ireland women's youth international footballers
Rugby union players from Dublin (city)
Rugby union props
Women's association footballers not categorized by position
People from Artane, Dublin